The 1985 Australian Football Championships Night Series was the 7th edition of the AFC Night Series, a VFL-organised national club Australian rules football tournament between the leading clubs from the VFL, the SANFL, the WAFL and State Representative Teams.

A total of 17 teams from across Australia played 16 matches over five months, with matches held during the pre-season and midweek throughout the premiership season.

Qualified Teams

1 Includes previous appearances in the Championship of Australia and NFL Night Series.

Venues

Knockout stage

Qualifying Playoff

Round 1

Quarter-finals

Semi-finals

Australian Football Championships Night Series final

References

Australian rules interstate football
History of Australian rules football
Australian rules football competitions in Australia
1985 in Australian rules football